Robert Winston Killebrew (born December 16, 1984) is a former professional gridiron football linebacker. He was signed by the Calgary Stampeders as a street free agent in 2009. He played college football for the Texas Longhorns.

External links
Calgary Stampeders bio

1984 births
Living people
American football linebackers
Canadian football linebackers
Texas Longhorns football players
Calgary Stampeders players
Players of American football from Texas
Sportspeople from Harris County, Texas
People from Spring, Texas